Many conditions of or affecting the human integumentary system have associated abnormalities of the teeth.

See also 
 List of cutaneous conditions
 List of contact allergens
 List of cutaneous conditions associated with internal malignancy
 List of cutaneous conditions caused by mutations in keratins
 List of cutaneous conditions caused by problems with junctional proteins
 List of genes mutated in cutaneous conditions
 List of histologic stains that aid in diagnosis of cutaneous conditions
 List of immunofluorescence findings for autoimmune bullous conditions
 List of inclusion bodies that aid in diagnosis of cutaneous conditions
 List of keratins expressed in the human integumentary system
 List of radiographic findings associated with cutaneous conditions
 List of specialized glands within the human integumentary system
 List of target antigens in pemphigoid
 List of target antigens in pemphigus

References 

 
 

Cutaneous conditions
Dermatology-related lists
Tooth pathology